Satyanarayan Singh (also written Satya Narain Singh) (1942 – 2 August 2020) was a Member of Bihar Legislative Assembly. He was elected from Chautham twice between 1990 and 2000 from Communist Party of India. He was state secretary of Bihar unit of Communist Party of India since 2015.

He died on 2 August 2020, from COVID-19 at AIIMS Patna during the COVID-19 pandemic in India.

Early life and career 
Satyanarayan Singh was born in 1942 at village Kaithi in Khagaria, Bihar to late Dwarika Prasad Singh and late Panchmukhi Devi. He had his primary education in the village school and secondary education at zila school in Monghyr (Present day Munger). After his school education, he studied at T.N.B College, Bhagalpur and later did his post graduation from Bhagalpur University. After that, he got a degree in Law and later took up a job of lecturer in Jagjivan Ram College, Jamalpur, Munger 
(at that time Monghyr). He returned to Khagaria to practice Law but after some time resigned his lectureship and left his law practice in 1968 to join and work full time for CPI.

Political career 
He started his political career from All India Student Federation, student wing of Communist Party of India. He was elected Mukhia of his gram panchayat in the year 1969 and continued in that post for twenty years. Then in the year 1980, he was elected Pramukh of the block panchayat samiti. He was also elected an MLA on CPI ticket in 1990 and also in 1995 from Beldaur Vidhan Sabha Constituency. In later years, he was actively involved in Kisan Sabha and worked for the rights of peasants and workers.

Personal life 
He is survived by a younger son, Ankit, who is a doctor, and four daughters.

References 

1942 births
2020 deaths
Indian communists
Members of the Bihar Legislative Assembly
Communist Party of India politicians from Bihar
Deaths from the COVID-19 pandemic in India
People from Khagaria district
Tilka Manjhi Bhagalpur University alumni